{{Infobox rail line
|name = Electric tram in Avranches
|image = Leprovost - AVRANCHES - La rue de la Constitution et Tramway.JPG
|image_width = 375px
|caption = Electric tram in Rue de la Constitution
|linelength = 
|gauge = 
|maxincline = 
|speed = 
| map = {{BS-map|inline=1|map = 

{{BS3|uexmABZgl|exSTRq||||Granville-Avranches-Sourdeval tramway to Sourdeval<ref>Jean Randé and Francois Librini: Granville Avranches Sourdeval. In: Archéologie ferroviaire (v2) – Atlas des lignes de chemins de fer disparues.</ref>}}

}} }}

Inaugurated in April 1907, the network consisted in a  line stretching across the town centre. Traction was electric. The tram closed on 2 August 1914.

 History 
The energy was supplied by a power plant built by Mr Ravous, a building contractor from Granville, and located near the Avranches station. It consisted of steam boilers, an engine room and an accumulator room.

The tramway was inaugurated by mayor Maurice Chevrel. Twelve departures per day were offered to passengers, from 6:30 to 20:45. 

Operations were suspende during the World War I and the electrical operation was subsequently not reinstated, but a horse-drawn carriage link then replaced it, until a bus link was introduced in September 1939.

Avranches-Est station, also known as the tramway station, was demolished around 1990. All that remains is the Place des Tramways.

 Stations 
The tramway had initially seven and later nine stations, as follows:
 Gare du Tram de Granville, also known as Gare de Chemins de fer de la Manche
 Avranches-Etat, now Avranches railway station (connection to standard gauge Lison–Lamballe railway and metre gauge Granville-Avranches-Sourdeval tramway)
 Malhoué, also known as Rue de Malloué, now Rue de la Liberté
 Bourg-l’Evêque, now Rue du Général-de-Gaulle
 Hotel de Ville, previously Place Littré
 Rue Valhubert
 Place Angot
 Octroi du Centre, now Place Patton
 Avranches-Est (connection to metre gauge Avranches–Saint-James tramway

It had been originally planned that the terminus of the line in the town would be located at the terminal station of the Avranches–Saint-James tramway, using its track between the Octroi du Centre (now Place Patton) and the station. The track and the switch connecting the two lines had been laid, but a fault in the switch had caused an accident in March 1907, when the Avranches to Saint-James tramway ran onto the track of the electric tramway towards the station, causing the derailment of a car at the end of the train. As the Société des chemins de fer de la Manche operating the electric line and the Compagnie des tramways normands operating the tramway from Avranches to Saint-James were initially unable to agree on how to operate the section together, the electric line ran initially only to Octroi du Centre.

During 1909, part of the services were extended from Avranches-État station to the Gare du Tram de Granville (also known as Gare de Chemins de fer de la Manche''). They just stopped at the Gare de l'Etat to pick-up passengers. By October 1909, the line was extended from Octroi du Centre to the Avranches–Saint-James tramway terminus.

Connections 
The electric tramway had the same gauge and was connected to the steam operated Granville-Avranches-Sourdeval tramway and Avranches–Saint-James tramway at either end of its line.

External links 

Les Chemins de Fer Secondaires de France
Tramway d'Avranches (13 photos and 2 time tables)

References

Tram transport in France
Transport in Normandy
Metre gauge railways in France